Vinícius & Toquinho is a 1974 album by Toquinho in partnership with Vinicius de Moraes.

Track listing

Personnel

Toquinho – arrangements, vocals, acoustic guitar, viola, piano
Vinícius de Morais - lyrics
Edu Lobo – arrangements
Francis Hime – arrangements
Zé Roberto – arrangements
Orlando Costa-Luigi - recording

References  

1974 albums
Toquinho albums
Vinicius de Moraes albums